Novomunasipovo (Yañı Monasip) is a rural locality (a village) in Staromunasipovsky Selsoviet, Burzyansky District, Bashkortostan, Russia. The population was 327 as of 2010. There are 4 streets.

Geography 
Novomunasipovo is located 25 km northeast of Starosubkhangulovo (the district's administrative centre) by road. Staromunasipovo is the nearest rural locality.

References 

Rural localities in Burzyansky District